The 1965 Penn Quakers football team was an American football team that represented the University of Pennsylvania during the 1965 NCAA University Division football season. Penn finished sixth in the Ivy League. 

In their first year under head coach Bob Odell, the Quakers compiled a 4–4–1 record and were outscored 192 to 136. Fred Jaffin was the team captain.

Penn's 2-4-1 conference record placed sixth in the Ivy League. The Quakers were outscored 165 to 100 by Ivy opponents. 

Penn played its home games at Franklin Field adjacent to the university's campus in Philadelphia, Pennsylvania.

Schedule

References

Penn
Penn Quakers football seasons
Penn Quakers football